Sonni Bāru, also known as Sonni Abū Bakr Dao was the 16th and last king of the Sonni dynasty to rule over the Songhai Empire located in west Africa. His rule was very short, from November 6, 1492, to April 12, 1493. The dates of his birth and death are not known.

He succeeded his father Sonni Ali on the latter's death. However, one of Sonni Ali's generals, Muhammad Ture, plotted to take power. Baru was challenged by Muhammad because he was not seen as a faithful Muslim. As soon as he had made his arrangements, he attacked Sonni Bāru on 18 February 1493. Sonni Bāru's army was defeated. There was another, more decisive battle on 12 April 1493, after which Sonni Bāru fled into exile. The usurper then took power as Askia Muhammad Ture.

Notes

References
.

Year of birth missing
Year of death missing
People of the Songhai Empire
History of Mali
15th-century monarchs in Africa